The Helicopter Flight Rescue System (HFRS) is a helicopter insertion and extraction tool that utilizes a longline and Personnel Carrying Device System (PCDS) to carry human loads below a helicopter in flight.  These systems are often referred to as "Long Line", "Short Haul", Class D Fixed Line (CDFL), and other terms, and is similar to other helicopter long line systems in use throughout the world.  By extending a rescuer below the aircraft and allowing the aircraft to remain clear of obstacles while a rescue is performed, a pilot can insert/extract rescuers and subjects in most types of terrain (slope angle, obstacles, and hazards permitting).

Under CARs, HFRS falls under Class D operations which includes all human loads carried externally (commonly referred to as Human External Cargo [HEC]).  By regulation, air carriers, operations personnel, and essential aircrew conducting Class D operations are required to be extensively trained. There must also be a memorandum of understanding between the tasking agency and the air operator in order to ensure a good working relationship. In British Columbia, Emergency Management BC (EMBC) enables volunteer search and rescue societies to perform HFRS to conduct various rescue missions.  

HFRS refers to the particular set of equipment approved by regulatory authority and sold as an integrated package or kit, suitable for use on a specific helicopter models and configurations. The system is modular and various components can be attached or detached as the need arises. Examples of modular components include a rescue basket, an "Aerial Rescue Platform" (commonly known as a Bouwman Bag), and various rescuer harnesses. The line length can be adjusted for various conditions such as tree canopy.  A critical factor of these systems is a redundant method of connection between the longline and the helicopter that is intended to prevent inadvertent load release while still allowing for intentional release.  This redundancy comes in 2 basic forms, a belly band, or dual hook.  Both systems provide a second attachment point that can be released by the pilot (and/or assistant on board) in the event of a bona fide emergency requiring the jettison of the load. 

A similar technique is used by linemen when constructing or maintaining power lines, and by maritime pilots between ship and shore.

HFRS in British Columbia
HFRS was pioneered in Canada by Parks Canada, who performed the first rescues using the long line system in the 1960s. From there, the system became commercialized, and available to industrial and Search and Rescue teams outside of the Parks Canada Safety Program. 
One of the earliest SAR teams in Canada to adopt the commercial system was North Shore Rescue, and was eventually followed by other teams with high call volumes, and mountainous terrain such as Golden SAR, Nelson SAR and Squamish SAR. These organizations recognized a need to move beyond reliance on conventional hover entry-exit techniques (still widely used). The system has proved to be safe, and cost effective, and now constitutes part of the Search and Rescue safety plans within the province of BC, with over 15 teams currently using the technique.

This kind of aerial maneuver originated in the Swiss Alps. In 1970, a mountain guide with Air Zermatt performed the first longline mountain rescue on north face of the Eiger. This mission forever changed mountain rescue operations

System Components
The HFRS system has multiple components which ultimately safely suspend a rescuer under the helicopter (extended below the skids) with two distinct actions required to release the load, and load bearing redundancy. The components include:

Pictures

References

External links
 Air Rescue Association of Canada Best Practices with Regard to HFRS/HET's

Rescue aviation
Articles containing video clips